Rasheed Yusuff (born 16 October 1994) is a Qatari handball player for Al Rayyan and the Qatari national team.

He represented Qatar at the 2019 World Men's Handball Championship. He was part of the Qatari team that won gold medals at the 2018 Asian Games in Jakarta.

References

1994 births
Living people
Qatari male handball players
Handball players at the 2018 Asian Games
Asian Games medalists in handball
Asian Games gold medalists for Qatar
Medalists at the 2018 Asian Games